Hazell is a name of British origin, and may refer to:

People

Surname
Andy Hazell (born 1978), British rugby player
Bert Hazell (1907–2009), British politician
Bob Hazell (born 1959), British football player
Charles Hazell, Canadian architect
Danielle Hazell (born 1988), British cricketer
Darrell Hazell (born 1964), American football coach
Eileen Hazell (1903–1984), Canadian sculptor and potter
Horace Hazell (1909–1990), British cricketer
Hy Hazell (1919–1970), British actress
Jeremy Hazell (born 1986), American basketball player 
Keeley Hazell (born 1986), British glamour model
Malcolm Hazell (born 1948), Australian public servant
Reuben Hazell (born 1979), British football player
Tim Hazell (born 1981), Australian football player
Tom F. Hazell (1892–1946), British fighter pilot
Tony Hazell (born 1947), British football player

First name
Hazell Dean (born 1956), British musician

Fiction
James Hazell, fictional character in the British television series Hazell
Thorpe Hazell, fictional character in stories by Victor Whitechurch

See also 
Hazel (disambiguation)

English-language surnames